Ostrovsky Institute may refer to:

Russian State Institute of Performing Arts in Leningrad, once called Ostrovsky Leningrad Theatre Institute (or Ostrovsky Institute)
Uzbekistan State Institute of Arts and Culture in Tashkent, formerly the Ostrovsky Institute, founded in 1945